Mokcheon Ma clan is one of the Korean clans. Their Bon-gwan is in Cheonan, South Chungcheong Province. They were sorted the same kind of clans as Jangheung Ma clan. According to the research held in 2000, the number of the Mokcheon Ma clan was 2982. Ma clan began when became the member of Gojoseon with Gija. Their founder was  who was one of the leading members of Baekje’s foundation.

See also 
 Korean clan names of foreign origin

References

External links 
 

 
Korean clan names of Chinese origin
Goguryeo people
Baekje people
Ma clans